Trevor Blake may refer to:
 Trevor Blake (sportsman) (1937–2004), New Zealand cricketer and field hockey player
 Trevor Blake (entrepreneur)